Pathankot Cantonment railway station (station code: PTKC) is located in Pathankot district in the Indian state of Punjab and serves Pathankot .

Name change
Chakki Bank railway station was renamed Pathankot Cantonment railway station in 2013.

The railway station

History
The -long  broad gauge Amritsar–Pathankot line was opened in 1884.

The -long -wide narrow-gauge Kangra Valley Railway from Pathankot to Joginder Nagar was commissioned in 1929.

The Mukerian–Pathankot line was built in 1952. The construction of the Pathankot–Jammu Tawi line was initiated in 1965, after the Indo-Pakistani War of 1965, and opened in 1971.

Electrification
Electrification work of the Jalandhar–Jammu line is completed in 2015.

Loco shed
Pathankot Cantonment had a steam loco shed which has now been decommissioned.

References

External links
 Trains at Chakki Bank

Railway stations in Pathankot district
Firozpur railway division
Transport in Pathankot